Mulheres Apaixonadas (English: Women In Love) is a Brazilian telenovela which originally aired on TV Globo from 17 February 2003 to 10 October 2003 with a total of 203 episodes. It was created by Manoel Carlos and written by him with Maria Carolina, Fausto Galvão and Vinícius Vianna, and directed by Marcelo Travesso, Ary Coslov, Ricardo Waddington, Rogério Gomes and José Luiz Villamarim.

It stars Christiane Torloni, José Mayer, Rodrigo Santoro, Camila Pitanga, Tony Ramos, Helena Ranaldi, Carolina Dieckmann, Paloma Duarte, Lavínia Vlasak, Carolina Kasting, Vanessa Gerbelli, Regiane Alves, Dan Stulbach, Vera Holtz, Marcello Antony, Giulia Gam and Suzana Vieira as the main characters.

Plot 
An enchanting tale of the conflicts assailing Helena, a lovely woman in her forties who must choose between her solid marriage and a flaming passion from the past. This movingly poetic tale portrays life through its female characters, showcasing the secrets and simplicity of love and the difficulties of relationships.

Cast 
Christiane Torloni as Helena Ribeiro Alves
José Mayer as César
Tony Ramos as Teófilo Ribeiro Alves (Téo)
Rodrigo Santoro as Diogo Ribeiro Alves
Camila Pitanga as Luciana Ribeiro Alves
Helena Ranaldi as Raquel
Giulia Gam as Heloísa
Marcello Antony as Sérgio
Carolina Dieckmann as Edwiges
Erik Marmo as Cláudio Moretti
Susana Vieira as Lorena Ribeiro Alves
Paloma Duarte as Marina
Regiane Alves as Dóris de Souza Duarte 
Dan Stulbach as Marcos
Natália do Vale as Sílvia
Vanessa Gerbelli as Fernanda
Vera Holtz as Santana
Lavínia Vlasak as Estela
Júlia Almeida as Vidinha 
Maria Padilha as Hilda
Alinne Moraes as Clara
Paula Picarelli as Rafaela
Marcos Caruso as Carlão
Oswaldo Louzada as Leopoldo Duarte 
Carmem Silva as Flora de Souza Duarte 
Carol Castro as Gracinha
Leonardo Miggiorin as Rodrigo
Carolina Kasting as Laura
Cláudio Marzo as Rafael Nogueira
Rafael Calomeni as Expedito
Pedro Furtado as Fred
Nicola Siri as Padre Pedro
Regina Braga as Ana
Umberto Magnani as Argemiro
Eduardo Lago as Leandro
Elisa Lucinda as Pérola
Martha Mellinger as Irene
Giselle Policarpo as Elisa
Pitty Webo as Marcinha
Marly Bueno as Marta Moretti
Serafim Gonzalez as Onofre Moretti
Paulo Coronato as Caetano
Walderez de Barros as Alzira
Bruna Marquezine as Salete
Manoelita Lustosa as Inês
Xuxa Lopes as Leila
Paulo Figueiredo as Afrânio
Guilhermina Guinle as Rosinha
Renata Pitanga as Shirley
Sônia Guedes as Matilde
Tião D'Ávila as Oswaldo Arruda
Victor Cugula as Lucas Ribeiro Alves
Ana Roberta Gualda as Paula Arruda (Paulinha)
Daniel Zettel as Carlinhos
Roberta Rodrigues as Zilda
Luciele di Camargo as Dirce
Arlete Heringer as Yvone
Lica Oliveira as Adelaide
Joana Medeiros as Eleonora
Sheila Mattos as Celeste
Caco Baresi as Orlando
Fabiana Karla as Célia
Luciana Rigueira as Odete
Maria Clara Gueiros as Cecília
Rodrigo Fauzi as Maurinho
Rogério Falabella as Dr. Alfredo
Zé Carlos Machado as Marcelo
Paulo Ascenção as Maitre
Laura Lustosa as Margareth
Tila Teixeira as Tereza
Laércio de Freitas as Ataulfo
Diego Gonçalves as Jairo
Andrea Bassit as Marly
Eduardo Estrela as Amadeu
Alessandra Colassanti as Rebeca
Chaguinha as Ivan
Priscila Dias as Sônia
Wilson Cardozo as Jeremias
Analu Silveira as Monique
Assayo Horisawa as Chica
Beta Perez as Simone
Carol Moonan as Sílvia
David Herman as Roberto
Edson Silva as Kleber
Juliana Didone as Luísa
Frederico Lessa as Antônio
Giovana Di Toni as Telma
Guilherme Caillaux as Reizinho
Idelcéia Santos as Maria
Isabela Lobato as Selma
Luca Bianchi as Alcides
Jabutu Alegreas Diego
Marcel Miranda as Washington
Marcelo Escorel as Nestor
Marise Gonçalves as Cândida
Paulo Junior as Tião
Ronaldo Reis as Robson
Sandra Hausen as Mirtes
Sylvio Meanda as Eugênio
Vera Freitas as Sandra
Reynaldo Gianecchini as Ricardo 
Cris Bonna as Isabel 
Beatriz Lyra
Juliana Mesquita as Renatinha 
Igor Cotrim as Romeu

Reception

Ratings

External links
 
 Mulheres Apaixonadas Official Website 
 Mulheres Apaixonadas at the Memoria Globo 

Brazilian telenovelas
2003 telenovelas
2003 Brazilian television series debuts
2003 Brazilian television series endings
TV Globo telenovelas
Brazilian LGBT-related television shows
Portuguese-language telenovelas
Alcohol abuse in television
Domestic violence in television